The 2020–21 Eastern Counties Football League, also known as the Thurlow Nunn League for sponsorship reasons, was the 78th season in the history of the Eastern Counties Football League, a football competition in England. Teams were divided into three divisions, the Premier Division at Step 5, and the geographically separated Division One North and Division One South (Eastern Senior League), both at Step 6 of the English football league system.

The allocations for Steps 5 and 6 for season 2020–21 were announced by the FA on 21 July, and were subject to appeal.

The 2020–21 season started in September and was suspended in December a result of the Covid-19 pandemic. The league season was subsequently abandoned.

Promotions, relegation and restructure
The scheduled restructure of non-League took place at the end of the season, with new divisions added to the Combined Counties and the United Counties League at step 5 for 2021-22, along with new a division in the Northern Premier League at step 4. Promotions from steps 5 to 4 and 6 to 5 were based on points per game across all matches over the two cancelled seasons (2019-20 and 2020-21), while teams were promoted to step 6 on the basis of a subjective application process.

Premier Division

The Premier Division comprised the same set of 20 teams which competed in the aborted competition the previous season.

League table

Stadia and locations

Division One North

Division One North comprised 19 teams, one less than in the previous season, following the resignation of Felixstowe & Walton United reserves.

League table

Division One South (Eastern Senior League)

Division One South featured 16 clubs which competed in the division last season, along with one new club:
 Brimsdown, transferred from the Spartan South Midlands League
In addition, Hackney Wick were relocated to the Spartan South Midlands League, but this relocation was reversed. On 27 August 2020, Lopes Tavares announced the renaming of the club to Athletic Newham.

League table

References

Eastern Counties Football League seasons
2020–21 in English football leagues
England, 9